The 33rd Cuban National Series saw further dominance from the previous year's group winners: Pinar del Río, Industriales, Villa Clara and Santiago de Cuba. Among them, only Pinar del Río won its group by fewer than seven games, in a 65-game season.

After winning their semifinal series, Villa Clara and Industriales fought to a seventh and deciding game. Villa Clara ultimately won, after Jorge Fumero knocked in Ariel Pestano for the game's winning run.

Standings

Group A

Group B

Group C

Group D

Playoffs

References

 (Note - text is printed in a white font on a white background, depending on browser used.)

Cuban National Series seasons
Base
Base
Cuba